Intercultural communication is a discipline that studies communication across different cultures and social groups, or how culture affects communication. It describes the wide range of communication processes and problems that naturally appear within an organization or social context made up of individuals from different religious, social, ethnic, and educational backgrounds. In this sense, it seeks to understand how people from different countries and cultures act, communicate, and perceive the world around them. Intercultural communication focuses on the recognition and respect of those with cultural differences. The goal is mutual adaptation between two or more distinct cultures which leads to biculturalism/multiculturalism rather than complete assimilation. It promotes the development of cultural sensitivity and allows for empathic understanding across different cultures.

Description
Intercultural communication is the idea of knowing how to communicate in different parts of the world. Intercultural communication uses theories within groups of people to achieve a sense of cultural diversity. This is in the hopes of people being able to learn new things from different cultures. The theories used give people an enhanced perspective on when it is appropriate to act in situations without disrespecting the people within these cultures; it also enhances their perspective on achieving cultural diversity through the ideas of intercultural communication.

Many people in intercultural business communication argue that culture determines how individuals encode messages, what medium they choose for transmitting them, and the way messages are interpreted. With regard to intercultural communication proper, it studies situations where people from different cultural backgrounds interact. Aside from language, intercultural communication focuses on social attributes, thought patterns, and the cultures of different groups of people. It also involves understanding the different cultures, languages and customs of people from other countries.

Learning the tools to facilitate cross-cultural interaction is the subject of cultural agility, a term presently used to design a complex set of competencies required to allow an individual or an organization to perform successfully in cross-cultural situations.

Intercultural communication plays a role in social sciences such as anthropology, cultural studies, linguistics, psychology, and communication studies. Intercultural communication is also referred to as the base for international businesses. Several cross-cultural service providers assist with the development of intercultural communication skills. Research is a major part of the development of intercultural communication skills. Intercultural communication is in a way the 'interaction with speakers of other languages on equal terms and respecting their identities'.

Identity and culture are also studied within the discipline of communication to analyze how globalization influences ways of thinking, beliefs, values, and identity within and between cultural environments. Intercultural communication scholars approach theory with a dynamic outlook and do not believe culture can be measured nor that cultures share universal attributes. Scholars acknowledge that culture and communication shift along with societal changes and theories should consider the constant shifting and nuances of society.

The study of intercultural communication requires intercultural understanding. Intercultural understanding is the ability to understand and value cultural differences. Language is an example of an important cultural component that is linked to intercultural understanding.

Theories
The following types of theories can be distinguished in different strands: focus on effective outcomes, on accommodation or adaption, on identity negotiation and management, on communication networks,on acculturation and adjustment.

Social engineering effective outcomes 
Cultural convergence
The theory that when two cultures come together, similarities in ideas and aspects will become more prevalent as members of the two cultures get to know one another. In a relatively closed social system, in which communication among members is unrestricted, the system as a whole will tend to converge over time toward a state of greater cultural uniformity. The system will tend to diverge toward diversity when communication is restricted.
Communication accommodation theory
This theory focuses on linguistic strategies to decrease or increase communicative distances. In relation to linguistics, communication accommodation theory is the idea when two people are speaking to one another, one participant modifies the way they speak to accommodate another person in a given context. This is similar to code-switching in the sense that people are changing their dialects from a given language, to adjust to a different setting for others to understand. Communication accommodation theory seeks to explain and predict why, when, and how people adjust their communicative behavior during social interaction and what social consequences result from these adjustments.
Intercultural adaption
Intercultural adaptation is the idea that after living in a culture for an extended period of time, people will start to develop the ideas, rules, values, among other themes of that culture. Adaptation theories conclude that in order to adapt, immigrants need to fully engage in changing one's self beliefs to that of the society's majority. To elaborate, for example, while someone lives abroad it is imperative they are ready to change in order to live cohesively with their new culture. By understanding Intercultural competence, we know that people have an understanding of what it takes to thrive in a culture, by following the norms and ideals that are presented. 
Intercultural adaptation involves learned communicative competence. Communicative competence is defined as thinking, feeling, and pragmatically behaving in ways defined as appropriate by the dominant mainstream culture. Communication competence is an outcomes-based measure conceptualized as functional/operational conformity to environmental criteria such as working conditions. Beyond this, adaptation means "the need to conform" to mainstream "objective reality" and "accepted modes of experience". 
Cultural adaptation is the process in which individuals are able to maintain stability and reestablish with their environment while in unfamiliar cultural environments. Intercultural adaptation is a two-way process, this is between the host culture as well as the individuals outside/home culture. This is based on whether the host culture is willing to adapt, adopt cultural sensitivity, and/or adopt some aspects of the incoming individual's culture. Intercultural adaptation is a two-way process. 
Co-cultural theory
Co-cultural theory is the idea pertaining to a group of people that someone belongs to, with people from different parts of the world sharing characteristics of one another.
In its most general form, co-cultural communication refers to interactions among underrepresented and dominant group members. Co-cultures include but are not limited to people of color, women, people with disabilities, gay men and lesbians, and those in the lower social classes. Co-cultural theory, as developed by Mark P. Orbe, looks at the strategic ways in which co-cultural group members communicate with others. In addition, a co-cultural framework provides an explanation for how different persons communicate based on six factors.
Cultural Fusion Theory
Cultural Fusion theory explains how immigrants can acculturate into the dominant culture they move to. They maintain important aspects of their culture while adopting aspects of the dominant culture. This creates an intercultural identity within an individual, their native identity as well as their new host culture identity.

Identity negotiation or management
Identity management theory
Identity negotiation
Cultural identity theory
Double-swing model

Communication networks 
Networks and outgroup communication competence
Intracultural versus intercultural networks
Networks and acculturation

Acculturation and adjustment 
Acculturation can be defined as the process of an individual or individuals exchanging or adopting certain culture values and practices that the dominant culture of their location possesses. Acculturation differs from assimilation because the people who are adopting new culture habits are still processing some of their original own culture habits. Young Yun Kim has identified three personality traits that could affect someone's cultural adaptation. These personality traits include openness, strength, and positive. With these personality traits, individuals will be more successful in acculturating than individuals who do not possess these traits. Kim proposes an alternative to acculturation is complete assimilation.
Communication acculturation
This theory attempts to portray "cross-cultural adaptation as a collaborative effort in which a stranger and the receiving environment are engaged in a joint effort."
Anxiety/Uncertainty management
When strangers communicate with hosts, they experience uncertainty and anxiety. Strangers need to manage their uncertainty as well as their anxiety in order to be able to communicate effectively with hosts and then to try to develop accurate predictions and explanations for hosts' behaviors.
Assimilation, deviance, and alienation states
Assimilation and adaption are not permanent outcomes of the adaption process; rather, they are temporary outcomes of the communication process between hosts and immigrants. "Alienation or assimilation, therefore, of a group or an individual, is an outcome of the relationship between deviant behavior and neglectful communication."
Assimilation
 Assimilation is the process of absorbing the traits of the dominant culture to the point where the group that was assimilated becomes indistinguishable from the host culture. Assimilation can be either forced or done voluntarily depending on situations and conditions. Regardless of the situation or the condition, it is very rare to see a minority group replace and or even forget their previous cultural practices.
Alienation
 Alienation frequently refers to someone who is ostracized or withdrawn from other people with whom they would ordinarily be expected to associate with. Hajda, a representative theorist and researcher of social alienation says, "alienation is an individuals feeling of uneasiness or discomfort which reflects his exclusion or self-exclusion from social and cultural participation."

Three perspectives on intercultural communication 
A study on cultural and intercultural communication came up with three perspectives, which are the indigenous approach, cultural approach, and cross-cultural approach.

 Indigenous approach: trying to understand the meaning of different cultures. The process of passing preserved indigenous knowledge and how that is interpreted 
 Cultural approach: is similar to the indigenous approach, however, the cultural approach also focuses on the sociocultural context of an individual.
 Cross cultural approaches: focuses on two or more cultures to perceive cross-cultural validity and generalizability.

Other theories
 Meaning of meanings theory – "A misunderstanding takes place when people assume a word has a direct connection with its referent. A common past reduces misunderstanding. Definition, metaphor, feedforward, and Basic English are partial linguistic remedies for a lack of shared experience."
 Face negotiation theory – "Members of collectivistic, high-context cultures have concerns for mutual face and inclusion that lead them to manage conflict with another person by avoiding, obliging, or compromising. Because of concerns for self-face and autonomy, people from individualistic, low-context cultures manage conflict by dominating or through problem solving"
 Standpoint theory – An individual's experiences, knowledge, and communication behaviors are shaped in large part by the social groups to which they belong. Individuals sometimes view things similarly, but other times have very different views in which they see the world. The ways in which they view the world are shaped by the experiences they have and through the social group they identify themselves to be a part of. "Feminist standpoint theory claims that the social groups to which we belong shape what we know and how we communicate.  The theory is derived from the Marxist position that economically oppressed classes can access knowledge unavailable to the socially privileged and can generate distinctive accounts, particularly knowledge about social relations."
 Stranger theory – At least one of the persons in an intercultural encounter is a stranger.  Strangers are a 'hyperaware' of cultural differences and tend to overestimate the effect of cultural identity on the behavior of people in an alien society, while blurring individual distinctions.
 Feminist genre theory – Evaluates communication by identifying feminist speakers and reframing their speaking qualities as models for women's liberation.
 Genderlect theory – "Male-female conversation is cross-cultural communication. Masculine and feminine styles of discourse are best viewed as two distinct cultural dialects rather than as inferior or superior ways of speaking. Men's report talk focuses on status and independence. Women's support talk seeks human connection."
 Cultural critical studies theory – The theory states that the mass media impose the dominant ideology on the rest of society, and the connotations of words and images are fragments of ideology that perform an unwitting service for the ruling elite.
 Marxism – Aims to explain class struggle and the basis of social relations through economics.

Authentic intercultural communication 
Authentic intercultural communication is possible. A theory that was found in 1984 and revisited on 1987 explains the importance of truth and intention of getting an understanding. Furthermore, if strategic intent is hidden, there can't be any authentic intercultural communication.

In intercultural communication, there could be miscommunication, and the term is called "misfire." Later on, a theory was founded that has three layers of intercultural communication. The first level is effective communication, second-level miscommunication, and third-level systemically distorted communication. It is difficult to go to the first level due to the speaker's position and the structure.

History of assimilation
Forced assimilation was very common in the European colonial empires the 18th, 19th, and 20th centuries. Colonial policies regarding religion conversion, the removal of children, the division of community property, and the shifting of gender roles primarily impacted North and South America, Australia, Africa, and Asia. 
Voluntary assimilation has also been a part of history dating back to the Spanish Inquisition of the late 14th and 15th centuries, when many Muslims and Jews voluntarily converted to Roman Catholicism as a response to religious prosecution while secretly continuing their original practices. Another example is when the Europeans moved to the United States.
in reference assimilation developed

Intercultural competence 

Intercultural communication is competent when it accomplishes the objectives in a manner that is appropriate to the context and relationship. Intercultural communication thus needs to bridge the dichotomy between appropriateness and effectiveness: Proper means of intercultural communication leads to a 15% decrease in miscommunication.

Appropriateness: Valued rules, norms, and expectations of the relationship are not violated significantly.
Effectiveness: Valued goals or rewards (relative to costs and alternatives) are accomplished.

Competent communication is an interaction that is seen as effective in achieving certain rewarding objectives in a way that is also related to the context in which the situation occurs. In other words, it is a conversation with an achievable goal that is used at an appropriate time/location.

Components

Intercultural communication can be linked with identity, which means the competent communicator is the person who can affirm others' avowed identities. As well as goal attainment is also a focus within intercultural competence and it involves the communicator to convey a sense of communication appropriateness and effectiveness in diverse cultural contexts.

Ethnocentrism plays a role in intercultural communication. The capacity to avoid ethnocentrism is the foundation of intercultural communication competence. Ethnocentrism is the inclination to view one's own group as natural and correct, and all others as aberrant.

People must be aware that to engage and fix intercultural communication there is no easy solution and there is not only one way to do so. Listed below are some of the components of intercultural competence.

 Context: A judgment that a person is competent is made in both a relational and situational context. This means that competence is not defined as a single attribute, meaning someone could be very strong in one section and only moderately good in another. Situationally speaking competence can be defined differently for different cultures. For example, eye contact shows competence in western cultures whereas, Asian cultures find too much eye contact disrespectful.
 Appropriateness: This means that one's behaviors are acceptable and proper for the expectations of any given culture.
 Effectiveness: The behaviors that lead to the desired outcome being achieved.
 Motivations: This has to do with emotional associations as they communicate interculturally. Feelings which are one's reactions to thoughts and experiences have to do with motivation. Intentions are thoughts that guide one's choices, it is a goal or plan that directs one's behavior. These two things play a part in motivation.

Basic tools for improvement 

The following are ways to improve communication competence:
 Display of interest: Showing respect and positive regard for the other person.
 Orientation to knowledge: Terms people use to explain themselves and their perception of the world.
 Empathy:  Behaving in ways that shows one understands the point of view of others
 Task role behavior: Initiate ideas that encourage problem solving activities.
 Relational role behavior: Interpersonal harmony and mediation.
 Tolerance for unknown and ambiguity: The ability to react to new situations with little discomfort.
 Interaction posture: Responding to others in descriptive, non-judgmental ways.
 Patience
 Active listening
 Clarity

Important factors 

 Proficiency in the host culture language: understanding the grammar and vocabulary.
 Understanding language pragmatics: how to use politeness strategies in making requests and how to avoid giving out too much information.
 Being sensitive and aware to nonverbal communication patterns in other cultures.
 Being aware of gestures that may be offensive or mean something different in a host culture rather than one's own culture.
 Understanding a culture's proximity in physical space and paralinguistic sounds to convey their intended meaning.
Mutual understanding with the aim of promoting a future of appreciation, robustness and diversity.

Traits 

 Flexibility.
 Tolerating high levels of uncertainty.
 Self-reflection.
 Open-mindedness.
 Sensitivity.
 Adaptability.
 "Thinking outside the box" and lateral thinking

Effective communication depends on the informal understandings among the parties involved that are based on the trust developed between them. When trust exists, there is implicit understanding within communication, cultural differences may be overlooked, and problems can be dealt with more easily. The meaning of trust and how it is developed and communicated varies across societies. Similarly, some cultures have a greater propensity to be trusting than others.

The problems in intercultural communication usually come from problems in message transmission and in reception. In communication between people of the same culture, the person who receives the message interprets it based on values, beliefs, and expectations for behavior similar to those of the person who sent the message. When this happens, the way the message is interpreted by the receiver is likely to be fairly similar to what the speaker intended. However, when the receiver of the message is a person from a different culture, the receiver uses information from his or her culture to interpret the message. The message that the receiver interprets may be very different from what the speaker intended.

Areas of interest

Cross-cultural business strategies 
Cross-cultural business communication is very helpful in building cultural intelligence through coaching and training in cross-cultural communication management and facilitation, cross-cultural negotiation, multicultural conflict resolution, customer service, business and organizational communication. Cross-cultural understanding is not just for incoming expats. Cross-cultural understanding begins with those responsible for the project and reaches those delivering the service or content.  The ability to communicate, negotiate and effectively work with people from other cultures is vital to international business.

Management
Important points to consider:

 Develop cultural sensitivity.
 Anticipate the meaning the receiver will get.
 Careful encoding.
 Use words, pictures, and gestures.
 Avoid slang, idioms, regional sayings.
 Selective transmission.
 Build relationships, face-to-face if possible.
 Careful decoding of feedback.
 Get feedback from multiple parties.
 Improve listening and observation skills.
 Follow-up actions.

Facilitation
There is a connection between a person's personality traits and the ability to adapt to the host-country's environment—including the ability to communicate within that environment.

Two key personality traits are openness and resilience. Openness includes traits such as tolerance for ambiguity, extroversion and introversion, and open-mindedness. Resilience, on the other hand, includes having an internal locus of control, persistence, tolerance for ambiguity, and resourcefulness.

These factors, combined with the person's cultural and racial identity and level of liberalism, comprise that person's potential for adaptation.

Miscommunication in a Business Setting 
In a business environment, communication is vital, and there could be many instances where there could be miscommunication. Globalization is a significant factor in intercultural communication and affects business environments. In a business setting, it could be more difficult to communicate due to different ways of thinking, feeling, and behaving. Due to globalization, more employees have negative emotions in a business environment. The reason why one gets negative feelings is because of miscommunication.

One study done entails the communication between non-native English speaking and native English speaking people in the United States. The study showed that, in a business environment, non-native English speakers and native English speakers had similar experiences in the workplace. Although native English speakers tried to breakdown the miscommunication, non-native English speakers were offended by the terms they used.

Cultural Perceptions 
There are common conceptualizations of attributes that define collectivistic and individualistic cultures. Operationalizing the perceptions of cultural identities works under the guise that cultures are static and homogeneous, when in fact cultures within nations are multi-ethnic and individuals show high variation in how cultural differences are internalized and expressed.

Globalization 
Globalization plays a central role in theorizing for mass communication, media, and cultural communication studies. Intercultural communication scholars emphasize that globalization emerged from the increasing diversity of cultures throughout the world and thrives with the removal of cultural barriers. The notion of nationality, or the construction of national space, is understood to emerge dialectically through communication and globalization.

The Intercultural Praxis Model by Kathryn Sorrells, Ph.D. shows us how to navigate through the complexities of cultural differences along with power differences. This model will help you understand who you are as an individual, and how you can better communicate with others that may be different from you. In order to continue living in a globalized society one can use this Praxis model to understand cultural differences (based on race, ethnicity, gender, class, sexual orientation, religion, nationality, etc.) within the institutional and historical systems of power. Intercultural Communication Praxis Model requires us to respond to someone who comes from a different culture than us, in the most open way we can. The media are influential in what we think of other cultures and what we think about our own selves. However it is important, we educate ourselves, and learn how to communicate with others through Sorrells' Praxis Model.

Sorrells’ process is made up of six points of entry in navigating intercultural spaces, including inquiry, framing, positioning, dialogue, reflection, and action. Inquiry, as the first step of the Intercultural Praxis Model, is an overall interest in learning about and understanding individuals with different cultural backgrounds and world-views, while challenging one's own perceptions. Framing, then, is the awareness of “local and global contexts that shape intercultural interactions;” thus, the ability to shift between the micro, meso, and macro frames. Positioning is the consideration of one's place in the world compared to others, and how this position might influence both world-views and certain privileges. Dialogue is the turning point of the process during which further understanding of differences and possible tensions develops through experience and engagement with cultures outside of one's own. Next, reflection allows for one to learn through introspection the values of those differences, as well as enables action within the world “in meaningful, effective, and responsible ways." This finally leads to action, which aims to create a more conscious world by working toward social justice and peace among different cultures. As Sorrells argues, “In the context of globalization, [intercultural praxis] … offers us a process of critical, reflective thinking and acting that enables us to navigate … intercultural spaces we inhabit interpersonally, communally, and globally."

Interdisciplinary orientation 
Cross-cultural communication endeavors to bring together such relatively unrelated areas as cultural anthropology and established areas of communication. Its core is to establish and understand how people from different cultures communicate with each other. Its charge is to also produce some guidelines with which people from different cultures can better communicate with each other.

Cross-cultural communication, as with many scholarly fields, is a combination of many other fields. These fields include anthropology, cultural studies, psychology and communication. The field has also moved both toward the treatment of interethnic relations, and toward the study of communication strategies used by co-cultural populations, i.e., communication strategies used to deal with majority or mainstream populations.

The study of languages other than one's own can serve not only to help one understand what we as humans have in common, but also to assist in the understanding of the diversity which underlines our languages' methods of constructing and organizing knowledge. Such understanding has profound implications with respect to developing a critical awareness of social relationships. Understanding social relationships and the way other cultures work is the groundwork of successful globalization business affairs.

Language socialization can be broadly defined as “an investigation of how language both presupposes and creates anew, social relations in cultural context”. It is imperative that the speaker understands the grammar of a language, as well as how elements of language are socially situated in order to reach communicative competence. Human experience is culturally relevant, so elements of language are also culturally relevant.  One must carefully consider semiotics and the evaluation of sign systems to compare cross-cultural norms of communication. There are several potential problems that come with language socialization, however. Sometimes people can overgeneralize or label cultures with stereotypical and subjective characterizations. Another primary concern with documenting alternative cultural norms revolves around the fact that no social actor uses language in ways that perfectly match normative characterizations. A methodology for investigating how an individual uses language and other semiotic activity to create and use new models of conduct and how this varies from the cultural norm should be incorporated into the study of language socialization.

Verbal communication 
Verbal intercultural communication techniques improve speakers' or listeners' capacity for speech production or comprehension. Depending on the communication situation, the plans could either be formal or informal. Verbal communication consists of messages being sent and received continuously with the speaker and the listener, it is focused on the way messages are portrayed. Verbal communication is based on language and use of expression, the tone in which the sender of the message relays the communication can determine how the message is received and in what context.

Factors that affect verbal communication:

 Tone of voice
 Use of descriptive words
 Emphasis on certain phrases
 Volume of voice
 Practice active listening

The way a message is received is dependent on these factors as they give a greater interpretation for the receiver as to what is meant by the message. By emphasizing a certain phrase with the tone of voice, this indicates that it is important and should be focused more on.

Along with these attributes, verbal communication is also accompanied with non-verbal cues. These cues make the message clearer and give the listener an indication of what way the information should be received.

Example of non-verbal cues

 Facial expressions
 Hand gestures
 Use of objects
 Body movement

In terms of intercultural communication there are language barriers which are effected by verbal forms of communication. In this instance there is opportunity for miscommunication between two or more parties. Other barriers that contribute to miscommunication would be the type of words chosen in conversation. Due to different cultures there are different meaning in vocabulary chosen, this allows for a message between the sender and receiver to be misconstrued.

Nonverbal communication 
Nonverbal communication refers to gestures, facial expressions, tone of voice, eye contact (or lack thereof), body language, posture, and other ways people can communicate without using language. Minor variations in body language, speech rhythms, and punctuality often cause differing interpretations of the situation among cross-cultural parties. Kinesic behavior is communication through body movement—e.g., posture, gestures, facial expressions and eye contact. The meaning of such behavior varies across countries. Clothing and the way people dress is used as a form of nonverbal communication.

Object language or material culture refers to how people communicate through material artifacts—e.g., architecture, office design and furniture, clothing, cars, cosmetics, and time. In monochronic cultures, time is experienced linearly and as something to be spent, saved, made up, or wasted. Time orders life, and people tend to concentrate on one thing at a time. In polychronic cultures, people tolerate many things happening simultaneously and emphasize involvement with people. In these cultures, people may be highly distractible, focus on several things at once, and change plans often.

Occulesics are a form of kinesics that includes eye contact and the use of the eyes to convey messages. Proxemics concern the influence of proximity and space on communication (e.g., in terms of personal space and in terms of office layout). For example, space communicates power in the US and Germany.

Paralanguage refers to how something is said, rather than the content of what is said—e.g., rate of speech, tone and inflection of voice, other noises, laughing, yawning, and silence.

Nonverbal communication has been shown to account for between 65% and 93% of interpreted communication. Minor variations in body language, speech rhythms, and punctuality often cause mistrust and misperception of the situation among cross-cultural parties. This is where nonverbal communication can cause problems with intercultural communication. Misunderstandings with nonverbal communication can lead to miscommunication and insults with cultural differences. For example, a handshake in one culture may be recognized as appropriate, whereas another culture may recognize it as rude or inappropriate.

See also

Adaptive behavior
Adaptive behaviors
Clyde Kluckhohn
Cross-cultural communication
Cultural competence
Cultural diversity
Cultural intelligence
Cultural schema theory
Cultural sensitivity
Culture shock
Framing (social sciences)
Human communication
Intercultural competence
Intercultural dialogue
Intercultural simulation
Intergroup dialogue
Lacuna model
Multilingualism
Richard D. Lewis
Value (personal and cultural)

References

Notes

Bibliography

 Aneas, Maria Assumpta; Sandín, María Paz (2009-01-28). "Intercultural and Cross-Cultural Communication Research: Some Reflections about Culture and Qualitative Methods". Forum Qualitative Sozialforschung / Forum: Qualitative Social Research. 10 (1). doi:10.17169/fqs-10.1.1251. ISSN 1438-5627.
 Bhawuk, D. P. & Brislin, R. (1992). "The Measurement of Intercultural Sensitivity Using the Concepts of Individualism and Collectivism", International Journal of Intercultural Relations(16), 413–36.
 Ellingsworth, H.W. (1983). "Adaptive intercultural communication", in: Gudykunst, William B (ed.), Intercultural communication theory, 195–204, Beverly Hills: Sage.
Evans, Adam, Suklun, Harika (2017). "Workplace diversity and intercultural communication: A phenomenological study".
 Fleming, S. (2012). "Dance of Opinions: Mastering written and spoken communication for intercultural business using English as a second language" 
Fox, Christine (1997-02-01). "The authenticity of intercultural communication". International Journal of Intercultural Relations. 21 (1): 85–103. doi:10.1016/S0147-1767(96)00012-0. ISSN 0147-1767.
 Graf, A. & Mertesacker, M. (2010). "Interkulturelle Kompetenz als globaler Erfolgsfaktor. Eine explorative und konfirmatorische Evaluation von fünf Fragebogeninstrumenten für die internationale Personalauswahl", Z Manag(5), 3–27.
 Griffin, E. (2000). A first look at communication theory (4th ed.). Boston, MA: McGraw-Hill. n/a.
 Groh, A. (2020). Theories of Culture. London: Routledge. 
 Gudykunst, William B., & M.R. Hammer.(1988). "Strangers and hosts: An uncertainty reduction based theory of intercultural adaption" in: Kim, Y. & W.B. Gudykunst (eds.), Cross-cultural adaption, 106–139, Newbury Park: Sage.
 Gudykunst, William B. (2003), "Intercultural Communication Theories", in: Gudykunst, William B (ed.), Cross-Cultural and Intercultural Communication, 167–189, Thousand Oaks: Sage.
Hidasi, Judit (2005). Intercultural Communication: An outline, Sangensha, Tokyo.
 Hogan, Christine F. (2013), "Facilitating cultural transitions and change, a practical approach",  Stillwater, USA: 4 Square Books. (Available from Amazon), 
 Hogan, Christine F. (2007), "Facilitating Multicultural Groups: A Practical Guide", London: Kogan Page, 
 Kelly, Michael., Elliott, Imelda & Fant, Lars. (eds.) (2001). Third Level Third Space – Intercultural Communication and Language in European Higher Education. Bern: Peter Lang.
 Kim Y.Y.(1995), "Cross-Cultural adaption: An integrative theory.", in: R.L. Wiseman (Ed.)Intercultural Communication Theory, 170 – 194, Thousand Oaks, CA: Sage.
 Messner, W. & Schäfer, N. (2012), "The ICCA™ Facilitator's Manual. Intercultural Communication and Collaboration Appraisal", London: Createspace.
 Messner, W. & Schäfer, N. (2012), "Advancing Competencies for Intercultural Collaboration", in: U. Bäumer, P. Kreutter, W. Messner (Eds.) "Globalization of Professional Services", Heidelberg: Springer.
 McGuire, M. & McDermott, S. (1988), "Communication in assimilation, deviance, and alienation states", in: Y.Y. Kim & W.B. Gudykunst (Eds.), Cross-Cultural Adaption, 90 – 105, Newbury Park, CA: Sage.
Monash University, (2021) What is intercultural competence, and why is it important? https://www.monash.edu/arts/monash-intercultural-lab/about-the-monash-intercultural-lab/what-is-intercultural-competence#:~:text=What%20is%20intercultural%20competence%2C%20and,backgrounds%20%E2%80%93%20at%20home%20or%20abroad.
 Oetzel, John G. (1995), "Intercultural small groups: An effective decision-making theory", in Wiseman, Richard L (ed.), Intercultural communication theory, 247–270, Thousands Oaks: Sage.
 Spitzberg, B. H. (2000). "A Model of Intercultural Communication Competence", in: L. A. Samovar & R. E. Porter (Ed.) "Intercultural Communication – A Reader", 375–387, Belmont: Wadsworth Publishing.
Su Kei, Shum (2015). "The Significance of Intercultural Communication for Businesses and the Obstacles that Managers should Overcome in Achieving Effective Intercultural Communication" (PDF).
 Wiseman, Richard L. (2003), "Intercultural Communication Competence", in: Gudykunst, William B (ed.), Cross-Cultural and Intercultural Communication, 191–208, Thousand Oaks: Sage.
Lustig, M. W., & Koester, J. (2010). Intercultural competence : interpersonal communication across cultures / Myron W. Lustig, Jolene Koester. Boston : Pearson/Allyn & Bacon, c2010
Mehrabian, A. (2007). Nonverbal communication . Aldine Transaction. https://doi.org/10.4324/9781351308724

Cultural anthropology
Human communication
Sociolinguistics
Interculturalism
Communication studies
Interlinguistics
Cultural competence
Culture
Cultural concepts
Pragmatics